The 1995–96 NHL season was the 79th regular season of the National Hockey League. The Stanley Cup winners were the Colorado Avalanche (formerly the Quebec Nordiques), who, in their first year as the Avalanche, swept the Florida Panthers in the finals, in four games.

League business
The 1995–96 season was the first season in Denver for the Avalanche, who had relocated from Quebec City where they were previously known as the Quebec Nordiques.  Prior to the season, Colorado was assigned to the Pacific Division of the Western Conference. They played at McNichols Arena, the building that the Colorado Rockies played in from 1976 to 1982 before they were purchased and moved to become the New Jersey Devils. The Avs would play in that building until they moved to the Pepsi Center in 1999.

It was also the final season for the original Winnipeg Jets, as they announced that they would be moving from Manitoba to Arizona and become the Phoenix Coyotes at season's end. The NHL would not return to Manitoba until the Atlanta Thrashers moved there to become the "new" Winnipeg Jets following the 2010–11 season.

This season would mark the last season the Buffalo Sabres would play in the Buffalo Memorial Auditorium, the Philadelphia Flyers at the CoreStates Spectrum, the Tampa Bay Lightning at the Thunderdome, the Senators at the Ottawa Civic Centre, and the Canadiens at the Montreal Forum. The Sabres made their new home at the Marine Midland Arena, the Flyers at the CoreStates Center, the Lightning at the Ice Palace, the Senators at the Corel Centre, and the Canadiens at the Molson Centre. The latter two arenas opened before the end of this season. With the Montreal Forum closed, Maple Leaf Gardens was the last remaining arena from the Original Six era at the time. The Boston Bruins played their first season at Fleet Center after spending the last 67 at the old Boston Garden, and the Vancouver Canucks played their first game at General Motors Place.

During the 1992–93 and 1993–94 seasons, each team played 84 games (including two neutral site games). The 1994–95 NHL lockout had resulted in a shortened 48-game season and the cancellation of the planned neutral site games. Starting in the 1995–96 season, the neutral site games were eliminated, which reduced the regular season to 82 games per team where it remains .

Third jersey program
Improvements in dye-sublimation printing on modern uniform fabrics, having been featured in recent seasons on uniforms in the National Basketball Association and the Canadian Football League, had caught the interest of the NHL, which decided to allow alternate jerseys that could take advantage of this technology to produce new and unusual designs not possible under traditional jersey-making techniques. Six teams elected to participate in the process, but St. Louis Blues coach and general manager Mike Keenan vetoed the Blues' proposed third jersey, which would have featured blaring trumpets across the front. The five teams that did participate were the Mighty Ducks of Anaheim, Boston Bruins, Los Angeles Kings, Pittsburgh Penguins, and Vancouver Canucks. 

The Ducks' and Kings' third jerseys proved unpopular at the time and were retired by the end of the season, while the Canucks underwent a complete rebrand for the 1997–98 season. The Penguins' third jersey was promoted to their primary road jersey for the 1997 Stanley Cup Playoffs through the 2001–02 season, and the Bruins retained their third jersey the longest, through the 2005–06 season.

Regular season
The Detroit Red Wings had a spectacular season, finishing with the second-highest regular-season point total in NHL history (131 points), and setting the NHL record for most wins ever in the regular season (62). However, they fell to the future Stanley Cup champion Avalanche in the Western Conference Final, the sixth game of which marked the beginning of the heated Detroit-Colorado rivalry, which would last for years to come. Jaromir Jagr broke the record for assists and points by a right winger in a single season . Mario Lemieux had the NHL's last 150+ point season with 161 points in 70 games. This would be the last season in which at least one player would score at least 60 goals (Jagr and Lemieux) until 2008. The New Jersey Devils became the first team since the 1969–70 Montreal Canadiens to miss the playoffs after winning the Stanley Cup the previous season.

Final standings

GP = Games Played, W = Wins, L = Losses, T = Ties, Pts = Points, GF = Goals For, GA = Goals Against

Teams that qualified for the playoffs are highlighted in bold.

Playoffs

Bracket

Awards

All-Star teams

Player statistics

Scoring leaders

Note: GP = Games Played, G = Goals, A = Assists, Pts = Points

Leading goaltenders
Regular season

Milestones

Debuts

The following is a list of players of note who played their first NHL game in 1995–96 (listed with their first team, asterisk(*) marks debut in playoffs):

Martin Biron, Buffalo Sabres
Jarome Iginla*, Calgary Flames
Jere Lehtinen, Dallas Stars
Miroslav Satan, Edmonton Oilers
Ed Jovanovski, Florida Panthers
Jeff O'Neill, Hartford Whalers
Jose Theodore, Montreal Canadiens
Saku Koivu, Montreal Canadiens
Patrik Elias, New Jersey Devils
Petr Sykora, New Jersey Devils
Steve Sullivan, New Jersey Devils
Bryan McCabe, New York Islanders
Todd Bertuzzi, New York Islanders
Daniel Alfredsson, Ottawa Senators
Daymond Langkow, Tampa Bay Lightning
Andrew Brunette, Washington Capitals
Shane Doan, Winnipeg Jets

Last games

The following is a list of players of note who played their last game in the NHL in 1995–96 (listed with their last team):
Cam Neely, Boston Bruins
Troy Murray, Colorado Avalanche
Bob Kudelski, Florida Panthers
Jimmy Carson, Hartford Whalers
Joe Cirella, Ottawa Senators (Last active player to have been a member of the Colorado Rockies)
Glenn Anderson, St. Louis Blues

Trading deadline
Trading deadline: March 20, 1996.
March 20, 1996: C Jesse Belanger traded from Florida to Vancouver for Vancouver's third round pick in 1996 Entry Draft and future considerations.
March 20, 1996: LW Ken Baumgartner traded from Toronto to Anaheim for Winnipeg's fourth round pick in 1996 Entry Draft (previously acquired).
March 20, 1996: D J. J. Daigneault traded from St. Louis to Pittsburgh for Pittsburgh's sixth round pick in 1996 Entry Draft.
March 20, 1996: LW Kevin Miller traded from San Jose to Pittsburgh for Pittsburgh's fifth round choice in 1996 Entry Draft and future considerations.
March 20, 1996: LW Pat Conacher and Calgary's sixth round pick in 1997 Entry Draft traded from Calgary to NY Islanders for C Bob Sweeney.
March 20, 1996: RW Kirk Maltby traded from Edmonton to Detroit for D Dan McGillis.
March 20, 1996: D Jaroslav Modry and Ottawa's eighth round pick in 1996 Entry Draft traded from Ottawa to Los Angeles for RW Kevin Brown.
March 20, 1996: LW Patrick Poulin, D Igor Ulanov and Chicago's second round pick in 1996 Entry Draft traded from Chicago to Tampa Bay for D Enrico Ciccone and Tampa Bay's second round pick in 1996 Entry Draft.
March 20, 1996: LW Yuri Khmylev and Buffalo's eighth round pick in 1996 Entry Draft traded from Buffalo to St. Louis for D Jean-Luc Grand-Pierre, Ottawa's second round pick in 1996 Entry Draft (previously acquired) and St. Louis' third round pick in 1997 Entry Draft.
March 20, 1996: C Dave Hannan traded from Buffalo to Colorado for Colorado's sixth round pick in 1996 Entry Draft.
March 20, 1996: RW Alek Stojanov traded from Vancouver to Pittsburgh for RW Markus Naslund.
March 20, 1996: RW Ravil Gusmanov traded from Winnipeg to Chicago for Chicago's fourth round pick in 1996 Entry Draft.
March 20, 1996: RW Joe Kocur traded from NY Rangers to Vancouver for G Kay Whitmore.

Coaches

Eastern Conference

Western Conference

See also
 List of Stanley Cup champions
 1995 NHL Entry Draft
 46th National Hockey League All-Star Game
 National Hockey League All-Star Game
 NHL All-Rookie Team
 1995 in sports
 1996 in sports

References
 
 
 
 
Notes

External links
Hockey Database
http://nhl.com/

 
1
1